Diamond Creek railway station is located on the Hurstbridge line in Victoria, Australia. It serves the north-eastern Melbourne suburb of Diamond Creek, and opened on 25 June 1912.

History
Diamond Creek station opened on 25 June 1912, when the railway line from Eltham was extended to Hurstbridge. Like the suburb itself, the station was named after the nearby Diamond Creek, which was given that name as it was believed that the water at the bottom of the creek bed was bright, due to the crystalline minerals of various shapes.

In 1957, the station was closed to goods traffic and, in 1959, flashing light signals were provided at the Hurstbridge Road level crossing, located nearby in the up direction of the station.

In 1979, the station building on Platform 1 was damaged by fire. In 1988, boom barriers were provided at the Hurstbridge Road level crossing.

On 22 March 1991, just after 19:00, a Hurstbridge-bound train collided with a stationary Flinders Street-bound train at the station, resulting in three people injured and three carriages derailing. Parts of the platform were also damaged in the collision.

A passing loop had been provided at the station for many years, believed to have been originally used as a goods siding. In 1994, a second platform was constructed on the passing loop. Before that, one train had to set back after using the platform, then enter the loop to allow another train to pass. Both platforms are bi-directional, however, with the introduction of electronic signalling in 2008, Platform 2 could only be used by Hurstbridge-bound trains. In 2013, Platform 2 received a signal pointing city-bound, allowing both platforms to become bi-directional again.

Diamond Creek was one of the last stations in Melbourne controlled by the staff and ticket safeworking system, including the use of semaphore signals. The station was a break between two sections of the safeworking system: Eltham to Diamond Creek, and Diamond Creek to Hurstbridge. As a result, Metro Trains staff were required to operate the safeworking system, including operating the points for the crossing loop. In 2008, the signals and the points were upgraded to be controlled electronically and, in early 2013, the safe working system was converted to Automatic & Track Control (ATC).

On 15 May 2019, the Level Crossing Removal Project announced that planning for the duplication of 1.5km of track between Diamond Creek and Wattleglen was underway, with construction due to commence in early 2022. As part of the duplication works, Platform 2 will also receive an upgrade.

Platforms and services
Diamond Creek has two side platforms. It is served by Hurstbridge line trains.

Platform 1:
  all stations and limited express services to Flinders Street; all stations services to Hurstbridge

Platform 2:
  all stations and limited express services to Flinders Street; all stations services to Hurstbridge, but is only used during peak hours.

Transport links
Dysons operates one route to and from Diamond Creek station, under contract to Public Transport Victoria: 
 : to Mernda station

Panorama Coaches operates two routes via Diamond Creek station, under contract to Public Transport Victoria:
 : Hurstbridge station – Greensborough station
 : Diamond Creek – Eltham station

References

External links
 Melway map at street-directory.com.au

Railway stations in Melbourne
Railway stations in Australia opened in 1912
Railway stations in the Shire of Nillumbik